Village Settlements were agricultural towns established in Queensland during the 1880s as a means to attract settlers.
In a bid to create a sense of community, these settlements consisted of a centralised village centre surround by 40 or 80 acre allotments.
Settlers would be assigned two allotments: a lot within the village where they could establish a home, and a larger allotment for farming.

The success of the scheme was largely influenced by the accessibility of the locations.
The scheme was reportedly drafted by Sir Samuel Griffith

List of village settlements

Notes: *The number of properties advertised and made available differed  **This place was not listed in the government advertisement.

References

Populated places in Queensland